The 1962 Cork Senior Football Championship was the 74th staging of the Cork Senior Football Championship since its establishment by the Cork County Board in 1887. The draw for the opening round fixtures took place on 28 January 1962. The championship began on 1 April and ended on 21 October 1962.

Avondhu entered the championship as the defending champions, however, they were beaten by Urhan in the first round.

On 21 October 1962, Macroom won the championship following a 3-04 to 1-04 defeat of Muskerry in the final. This was their 10th championship title overall and their first title since 1958. It remains their last championship title.
Mitchelstown's Mickey Barrett was the championship's top scorer with 0-18.

Team changes

To Championship

Promoted from the Cork Junior Football Championship
 Mitchelstown

From Championship

Regraded to the Cork Junior Football Championship
 Glanmire

Results

First round

Second round

Quarter-finals

Semi-finals

Final

Championship statistics

Top scorers

Overall

In a single game

References

Cork Senior Football Championship